Tina Ambani (née Munim) is a former Indian actress. She is married to Anil Ambani, Chairman of Reliance Group. She is actively involved in many foundations and charities. Many of these were established in the memory of her in-laws, Dhirubhai and Kokilaben Ambani. Her work ranges from elder care to promotion of Indian art.

Personal life
Ambani was born Tina Munim on 11 February 1957. She graduated high school in 1975 from the MM Pupils Own School in Khar, Bombay. The same year, she was crowned Femina Teen Princess India 1975 and represented India at the Miss Teenage Intercontinental contest in Aruba, where she was crowned second runner-up.She subsequently enrolled in Jai Hind College for a degree in arts. Later in 70s, she joined the Hindi film industry and had a successful career as a leading actress, for thirteen years.

On 2 February 1991, she married Anil Ambani, the younger son of Indian business tycoon Dhirubhai Ambani who founded Reliance Industries. They have two sons Jai Anmol (born in December 1991) and Jai Anshul (born in September 1995). The eldest, Jai Anmol married Khrisha Shah on 20 February 2022. Munim's brother-in-law is Asia's richest man, Mukesh Ambani who is the chairman, managing director, and largest shareholder of Reliance Industries Ltd (RIL). Nita Ambani, founder of Reliance Foundation, and wife of Mukesh,is her sister-in-law.

Career

Films
Munim made her debut in Hindi films with filmmaker Dev Anand's Des Pardes. Her other films with Dev Anand include Lootmaar, and Man Pasand. She was cast opposite Amol Palekar in Basu Chatterjee's Baaton Baaton Mein.
 Her notable films with Rishi Kapoor include Karz, and Yeh Vaada Raha.She starred with actor Rajesh Khanna in many films including Fiffty Fiffty, Souten, Bewafai, Suraag , Insaaf Main Karoonga, Rajput, Aakhir Kyon?, Paapi Pet Ka Sawaal Hai, Alag Alag, Bhagwaan Dada and Adhikar. Her last film was Jigarwala, released in 1991. In an interview to Simi Garewal, Munim said: "Sometimes I feel [that I left films too soon] too, but then I felt that there was a lot more to the world that I wanted to explore and experience, and not just stick to movies. I decided to quit. I never regretted it. I never wanted to go back, ever."

Arts and culture
With the aim to offer young artists a platform to exhibit alongside seasoned veterans and acknowledged masters, she organised the first Harmony Art show in 1995. In 2008, Harmony Art Foundation showcased upcoming Indian artists at Christie's in London, drawing attention to the wealth of talent in India. She has served on the board of trustees of the Peabody Essex Museum in Salem, Massachusetts, which is the oldest continually operating museum in the US since 2008.

In addition, she has served on the advisory board of the National Gallery of Modern Art, Mumbai and  the National Institute of Design, Ahmedabad. She was also nominated to the reconstituted General Assembly of the Indian Council for Cultural Relations (ICCR). She has been actively associated with several welfare activities such as Aseema, an NGO engaged in the rehabilitation of street children,  and the restoration of Elephanta Island, a World Heritage Site near Mumbai, with the Archaeological Survey of India and UNESCO.

Elder welfare
In 2004, Ambani established Harmony for Silvers Foundation, a Mumbai-based non-government organisation that seeks to enhance the quality of life of the elderly. Its activities have included Harmony – Celebrate Age, the magazine, now in its 14th year; the portal www.harmonyindia.org; Harmony Interactive Centre for Silver Citizens, in South Mumbai; the Harmony Research Division; the Harmony Silver Awards; and the Harmony Senior Citizens’ Runs at the Mumbai, Delhi and Bengaluru marathons.

Healthcare
In order to bridge the gaps in Indian healthcare, Ambani launched the Kokilaben Dhirubhai Ambani Hospital & Medical Research Institute (KDAH) in Mumbai in 2009, a quaternary care facility. It is the only hospital in Mumbai to receive accreditation from the JCI (Joint Commission International, USA), NABH (National Accreditation Board for Healthcare, India), CAP (College of American Pathologists, USA) and NABL (National Accreditation Board for Laboratories, India). Other standouts include the first comprehensive centre for liver transplant and the first integrated centre for children's cardiac care in western India; its robotic surgery programme; the centres for rehabilitation and sports medicine; and its initiative to open 18 cancer care centres in rural Maharashtra.

Filmography

References

External links

Living people
Tina
Indian film actresses
Actresses in Hindi cinema
Actresses from Mumbai
Gujarati people
Female models from Mumbai
Reliance Group people
1957 births
Businesswomen from Maharashtra
21st-century Indian businesswomen
21st-century Indian businesspeople
Indian women chief executives